National Highway 79 (NH 79) is a National Highway in India entirely within the state of Tamil Nadu. It connects with NH 44 and NH 544 at Salem. NH 79 connects NH 68 and SH 69 at Ulundurpettai and SH 6 at kallakurichi. It was upgraded to a dual carriageway road in two phases on a Build-operate-transfer basis by Reliance Infrastructure and Maytas.

Traffic 
NH 79 is an important connecting road for vehicles travelling from the two major cities of Coimbatore and Kochi. NH 79 directly connects Salem with Chennai, and indirectly Coimbatore, Erode, Tirupur and the cities around these areas.

Route 
Ulundurpettai - Elavanasur kottai - Thiyagadurgam - Kallakurichi - Chinnasalem, Thalaivasal - Kattukottai - Attur - Pethanaickenpalayam - Vazhapadi - Salem.

Junctions list 

  Terminal near Salem.
  near Salem
  near Attur
  near Chinnasalem
  Terminal near Ulundurpettai.

Gallery

See also 
 List of National Highways in India
 List of National Highways in India by state
 National Highways Development Project

References 

NH79
Frequent accidents fatal and major accidents are ver often between the kattukottai bridge and Adayar Ananada bhavan.In this week alone 7 accidents occurred.
Recently in July 2022 the roads were overlaid.As a result,the level of thar road got higher and mud road lower.As a result, two wheelers when sidelined by over speeding four wheelers,lost their balance and fell down with fractures. Myself is a victim in March 2019.
It has been more than a month the imbalance between the thar road and mud road remains unrectified. A slope has to be made immediately to avoid more accidents like that.Please attend this immediately.
Elango k
Advocate
9444178379

External links
 NH 79 on OpenStreetMap

National highways in India
79